S. Kumaran (25 February 1923 - 24 December 1991) was a Punnapra-vayalar freedom fighter, Communist Party of India leader and former MP (Rajya Sabha) and former Mararikulam MLA.

Biography
He was born in 1923, the son of Kittachan and Kochuparu in Kochuthakidiyil House, Aryaad,
Alappuzha. He organized coir factory workers and entered politics and took part in the national freedom struggle, especially the Punnapra-Vayalar struggle. Freedom fighter and Communist party leader Mararikulam MLA the late S.Damodaran Ex. MLA is his brother.

Political activity  
 Beginning with the regional action of the State Congress as part of the Quit India Movement.
 Joined the Communist Party of India in 1938 
 Joined the State Committee in 1946. 
 In 1966, the CPI Became Secretary of State.

References

1923 births
1991 deaths
Communist Party of India politicians from Kerala
Kerala politicians
Indian independence activists from Kerala
Indian independence activists